Eagle Point Township is one of twenty-four townships in Ogle County, Illinois, USA.  As of the 2010 census, its population was 227 and it contained 106 housing units.

History
Eagle Point Township was formed in September 1869 from a portion of Buffalo Township.

Geography
It is a fractional township, smaller than a normal township of 36 square miles.

Cemeteries
The township contains these four cemeteries: Eagle Point, Elkhorn, Nichols and Webster.

Demographics

School districts
 Polo Community Unit School District 222

Political districts
 Illinois's 16th congressional district
 State House District 90
 State Senate District 45

References
 
 United States Census Bureau 2009 TIGER/Line Shapefiles
 United States National Atlas

External links
 City-Data.com
 Illinois State Archives
 Township Officials of Illinois

Townships in Ogle County, Illinois
Populated places established in 1869
1869 establishments in Illinois
Townships in Illinois